Attitude is the third and final studio album by the post-punk band Rip Rig + Panic, released in 1983 by Virgin Records.

Reception

In Melody Maker, Lynden Barker described the album as "marvellous", saying that "(t)hough not as immediately appealing as God ... it possesses a multi-layered makeup that becomes more and more exciting on each successive spin". Douglas Baptie of The Digital Fix wondered "Why wasn't it more popular?" and said that the album "somehow combines the best qualities of the previous two". The List'''s Neil Cooper called Attitude "the most honed, conventionally focused and 'produced'" of Rip Rig + Panic's three.

 Track listing 

 Personnel 
Adapted from the Attitude'' liner notes.

Rip Rig + Panic
 Neneh Cherry – vocals (A1, A2, A6, B1, B2, B4)
 Sean Oliver – bass guitar
 Gareth Sager – guitar (A4, A6, B1, B3), vocals (B1, B2, B6), alto saxophone (B3, B6), clarinet (A1, A2), piano (A5), horn and string arrangement (A1, A2, A4, A6, B4, B5), production, design
 Bruce Smith – drums (A1-A3, B1, B3, B4)
 Mark Springer – piano (A1-A3, A6, B1, B4-B6), vocals (A4, B4, B6), soprano saxophone (B2), harmonica (B4)
Additional musicians
 David Defries – trumpet (A1, A4, B1, B2, B4)
 Woo Honeymoon – violin (A2, A4, A6, B1, B4)
 Giles Leaman – additional drums and percussion
 Steve Noble – drums (A4, A6, B2, B6)

Additional musicians (cont.)
 Andrea Oliver – vocals (A4, B6)
 Sarah Sarahandi – viola (A2, A4-A6, B1, B2, B4, B5)
 Dave "Flash" Wright – tenor saxophone (A1, A3, A4, A5, B1, B2, B4-B6)
Production and additional personnel
 T. Charrington  – photography
 Tim Hunt – engineering
 Adam Kidron – production
 Jill Mumford – design
 Mark Stewart – engineering
 Ken Thomas – engineering
 Nick Watson – remastering

Release history

References

External links 
 

1983 albums
Rip Rig + Panic albums
Virgin Records albums
Albums produced by Adam Kidron